In music theory, the tritone is defined as a musical interval composed of three adjacent whole tones (six semitones). For instance, the interval from F up to the B above it (in short, F–B) is a tritone as it can be decomposed into the three adjacent whole tones F–G, G–A, and A–B.

Narrowly defined, each of these whole tones must be a step in the scale, so by this definition, within a diatonic scale there is only one tritone for each octave. For instance, the above-mentioned interval F–B is the only tritone formed from the notes of the C major scale. More broadly, a tritone is also commonly defined as any interval with a width of three whole tones (spanning six semitones in the chromatic scale), regardless of scale degrees. According to this definition, a diatonic scale contains two tritones for each octave. For instance, the above-mentioned C major scale contains the tritones F–B (from F to the B above it, also called augmented fourth) and B–F (from B to the F above it, also called diminished fifth, semidiapente, or semitritonus); the latter is decomposed as a semitone B–C, a whole tone C–D, a whole tone D–E, and a semitone E–F, for a total width of three whole tones, but composed as four steps in the scale. In twelve-equal temperament, the tritone divides the octave exactly in half as 6 of 12 semitones or 600 of 1,200 cents.

In classical music, the tritone is a harmonic and melodic dissonance and is important in the study of musical harmony. The tritone can be used to avoid traditional tonality: "Any tendency for a tonality to emerge may be avoided by introducing a note three whole tones distant from the key note of that tonality." The tritone found in the dominant seventh chord can also drive the piece of music towards resolution with its tonic. These various uses exhibit the flexibility, ubiquity, and distinctness of the tritone in music.

The condition of having tritones is called tritonia; that of having no tritones is atritonia. A musical scale or chord containing tritones is called tritonic; one without tritones is atritonic.

Augmented fourth and diminished fifth 

Since a chromatic scale is formed by 12 pitches (each a semitone apart from its neighbors), it contains 12 distinct tritones, each starting from a different pitch and spanning six semitones. According to a complex but widely used naming convention, six of them are classified as augmented fourths, and the other six as diminished fifths.

Under that convention, a fourth is an interval encompassing four staff positions, while a fifth encompasses five staff positions (see interval number for more details).
The augmented fourth (A4) and diminished fifth (d5) are defined as the intervals produced by widening the perfect fourth and narrowing the perfect fifth by one chromatic semitone.
They both span six semitones, and they are the inverse of each other, meaning that their sum is exactly equal to one perfect octave (A4 + d5 = P8).
In twelve-tone equal temperament, the most commonly used tuning system, the A4 is equivalent to a d5, as both have the size of exactly half an octave. In most other tuning systems, they are not equivalent, and neither is exactly equal to half an octave.

Any augmented fourth can be decomposed into three whole tones. For instance, the interval F–B is an augmented fourth and can be decomposed into the three adjacent whole tones F–G, G–A, and A–B.

It is not possible to decompose a diminished fifth into three adjacent whole tones. The reason is that a whole tone is a major second, and according to a rule explained elsewhere, the composition of three seconds is always a fourth (for instance, an A4). To obtain a fifth (for instance, a d5), it is necessary to add another second. For instance, using the notes of the C major scale, the diminished fifth B–F can be decomposed into the four adjacent intervals
 B–C (minor second), C–D (major second), D–E (major second), and E–F (minor second).
Using the notes of a chromatic scale, B–F may be also decomposed into the four adjacent intervals
 B–C (major second), C–D (major second), D–E (major second), and E–F (diminished second).
Notice that the last diminished second is formed by two enharmonically equivalent notes (E and F). On a piano keyboard, these notes are produced by the same key. However, in the above-mentioned naming convention, they are considered different notes, as they are written on different staff positions and have different diatonic functions within music theory.

Definitions 

A tritone (abbreviation: TT) is traditionally defined as a musical interval composed of three whole tones. As the symbol for whole tone is T, this definition may also be written as follows:

 TT = T+T+T

Only if the three tones are of the same size (which is not the case for many tuning systems) can this formula be simplified to:

 TT = 3T

This definition, however, has two different interpretations (broad and strict).

Broad interpretation (chromatic scale) 
In a chromatic scale, the interval between any note and the previous or next is a semitone. Using the notes of a chromatic scale, each tone can be divided into two semitones:
 T = S+S

For instance, the tone from C to D (in short, C–D) can be decomposed into the two semitones C–C and C–D by using the note C, which in a chromatic scale lies between C and D. This means that, when a chromatic scale is used, a tritone can be also defined as any musical interval spanning six semitones:

 TT = T+T+T = S+S+S+S+S+S.

According to this definition, with the twelve notes of a chromatic scale it is possible to define twelve different tritones, each starting from a different note and ending six notes above it. Although all of them span six semitones, six of them are classified as augmented fourths, and the other six as diminished fifths.

Strict interpretation (diatonic scale) 
Within a diatonic scale, whole tones are always formed by adjacent notes (such as C and D) and therefore they are regarded as incomposite intervals. In other words, they cannot be divided into smaller intervals. Consequently, in this context the above-mentioned "decomposition" of the tritone into six semitones is typically not allowed.

If a diatonic scale is used, with its 7 notes it is possible to form only one sequence of three adjacent whole tones (T+T+T). This interval is an A4. For instance, in the C major diatonic scale (C–D–E–F–G–A–B–...), the only tritone is from F to B. It is a tritone because F–G, G–A, and A–B are three adjacent whole tones. It is a fourth because the notes from F to B are four (F, G, A, B). It is augmented (i.e., widened) because it is wider than most of the fourths found in the scale (they are perfect fourths).

According to this interpretation, the d5 is not a tritone. Indeed, in a diatonic scale, there is only one d5, and this interval does not meet the strict definition of tritone, as it is formed by one semitone, two whole tones, and another semitone:

 d5 = S+T+T+S.

For instance, in the C major diatonic scale, the only d5 is from B to F. It is a fifth because the notes from B to F are five (B, C, D, E, F). It is diminished (i.e. narrowed) because it is smaller than most of the fifths found in the scale (they are perfect fifths).

Size in different tuning systems 

In twelve-tone equal temperament, the A4 is exactly half an octave (i.e., a ratio of :1 or 600 cents. The inverse of 600 cents is 600 cents. Thus, in this tuning system, the A4 and its inverse (d5) are equivalent.

The half-octave or equal tempered A4 and d5 are unique in being equal to their own inverse (each to the other). In other meantone tuning systems, besides 12-tone equal temperament, A4 and d5 are distinct intervals because neither is exactly half an octave. In any meantone tuning near to -comma meantone the A4 is near to the ratio 7:5 (582.51) and the d5 to 10:7 (617.49), which is what these intervals are in septimal meantone temperament. In 31 equal temperament, for example, the A4 is 580.65 cents, whereas the d5 is 619.35 cents. This is perceptually indistinguishable from septimal meantone temperament.

Since they are the inverse of each other, by definition A4 and d5 always add up to exactly one perfect octave:
 A4 + d5 = P8.
On the other hand, two A4 add up to six whole tones. In equal temperament, this is equal to exactly one perfect octave:
 A4 + A4 = P8.
In quarter-comma meantone temperament, this is a diesis (128:125) less than a perfect octave:
 A4 + A4 = P8 − diesis.

In just intonation several different sizes can be chosen both for the A4 and the d5. For instance, in 5-limit tuning, the A4 is either 45:32 or 25:18, and the d5 is either 64:45 or 36:25. The 64:45 just diminished fifth arises in the C major scale between B and F, consequently the 45:32 augmented fourth arises between F and B.

These ratios are not in all contexts regarded as strictly just but they are the justest possible in 5-limit tuning. 7-limit tuning allows for the justest possible ratios (ratios with the smallest numerator and denominator), namely 7:5 for the A4 (about 582.5 cents, also known as septimal tritone) and 10:7 for the d5 (about 617.5 cents, also known as Euler's tritone).
These ratios are more consonant than 17:12 (about 603.0 cents) and 24:17 (about 597.0 cents), which can be obtained in 17-limit tuning, yet the latter are also fairly common, as they are closer to the equal-tempered value of 600 cents.

Eleventh harmonic 

The ratio of the eleventh harmonic, 11:8 (551.318 cents; approximated as F4 above C1), known as the lesser undecimal tritone or undecimal semi-augmented fourth, is found in some just tunings and on many instruments. For example, very long alphorns may reach the twelfth harmonic and transcriptions of their music usually show the eleventh harmonic sharp (F above C, for example), as in Brahms's First Symphony. This note is often corrected to 4:3 on the natural horn in just intonation or Pythagorean tunings, but the pure eleventh harmonic was used in pieces including Britten's Serenade for tenor, horn and strings. Ivan Wyschnegradsky considered the major fourth a good approximation of the eleventh harmonic.

Dissonance and expressiveness 

Ján Haluska wrote:

Harry Partch has written:

Common uses

Occurrences in diatonic scales 
The augmented fourth (A4) occurs naturally between the fourth and seventh scale degrees of the major scale (for example, from F to B in the key of C major). It is also present in the natural minor scale as the interval formed between the second and sixth scale degrees (for example, from D to A in the key of C minor). The melodic minor scale, having two forms, presents a tritone in different locations when ascending and descending (when the scale ascends, the tritone appears between the third and sixth scale degrees and the fourth and seventh scale degrees, and when the scale descends, the tritone appears between the second and sixth scale degrees). Supertonic chords using the notes from the natural minor mode thus contain a tritone, regardless of inversion. Containing tritones, these scales are tritonic.

Occurrences in chords 

The dominant seventh chord in root position contains a diminished fifth (tritone) within its pitch construction: it occurs between the third and seventh above the root. In addition, augmented sixth chords, some of which are enharmonic to dominant seventh chords, contain tritones spelled as augmented fourths (for example, the German sixth, from A to D in the key of A minor); the French sixth chord can be viewed as a superposition of two tritones a major second apart.

The diminished triad also contains a tritone in its construction, deriving its name from the diminished-fifth interval (i.e. a tritone). The half-diminished seventh chord contains the same tritone, while the fully diminished seventh chord is made up of two superposed tritones a minor third apart.

Other chords built on these, such as ninth chords, often include tritones (as diminished fifths).

Resolution 

In all of the sonorities mentioned above, used in functional harmonic analysis, the tritone pushes towards resolution, generally resolving by step in contrary motion. This determines the resolution of chords containing tritones.

The augmented fourth resolves outward to a minor or major sixth (the first measure below). The inversion of this, a diminished fifth, resolves inward to a major or minor third (the second measure below). The diminished fifth is often called a tritone in modern tonal theory, but functionally and notationally it can only resolve inwards as a diminished fifth and is therefore not reckoned a tritone—that is, an interval composed of three adjacent whole tones—in mid-renaissance (early 16th-century) music theory.

Other uses 

The half-octave tritone interval is used in the musical/auditory illusion known as the tritone paradox.

Historical uses 

The tritone is a restless interval, classed as a dissonance in Western music from the early Middle Ages through to the end of the common practice period. This interval was frequently avoided in medieval ecclesiastical singing because of its dissonant quality. The first explicit prohibition of it seems to occur with the development of Guido of Arezzo's hexachordal system, who suggested that rather than make B a diatonic note, the hexachord be moved and based on C to avoid the F–B tritone altogether. Later theorists such as Ugolino d'Orvieto and Tinctoris advocated the inclusion of B.

From then until the end of the Renaissance the tritone was regarded as an unstable interval and rejected as a consonance by most theorists.

Johann Joseph Fux cites the phrase in his seminal 1725 work , Georg Philipp Telemann in 1733 describes, "mi against fa", which the ancients called "Satan in music"—and Johann Mattheson, in 1739, writes that the "older singers with solmization called this pleasant interval  or 'the devil in music'." Although the latter two of these authors cite the association with the devil as from the past, there are no known citations of this term from the Middle Ages, as is commonly asserted. However Denis Arnold, in the New Oxford Companion to Music, suggests that the nickname was already applied early in the medieval music itself:

That original symbolic association with the devil and its avoidance led to Western cultural convention seeing the tritone as suggesting "evil" in music. However, stories that singers were excommunicated or otherwise punished by the Church for invoking this interval are likely fanciful. In all these expressions, including the commonly cited , the "mi" and "fa" refer to notes from two adjacent hexachords. For instance, in the tritone B–F, B would be "mi", that is the third scale degree in the "hard" hexachord beginning on G, while F would be "fa", that is the fourth scale degree in the "natural" hexachord beginning on C.

Later, with the rise of the Baroque and Classical music era, composers accepted the tritone, but used it in a specific, controlled way—notably through the principle of the tension-release mechanism of the tonal system. In that system (which is the fundamental musical grammar of Baroque and Classical music), the tritone is one of the defining intervals of the dominant-seventh chord and two tritones separated by a minor third give the fully diminished seventh chord its characteristic sound. In minor, the diminished triad (comprising two minor thirds, which together add up to a tritone) appears on the second scale degree—and thus features prominently in the progression iio–V–i. Often, the inversion iio6 is used to move the tritone to the inner voices as this allows for stepwise motion in the bass to the dominant root. In three-part counterpoint, free use of the diminished triad in first inversion is permitted, as this eliminates the tritone relation to the bass.

It is only with the Romantic music and modern classical music that composers started to use it totally freely, without functional limitations notably in an expressive way to exploit the "evil" connotations culturally associated with it, such as Franz Liszt's use of the tritone to suggest Hell in his Dante Sonata:

—or Wagner's use of timpani tuned to C and F to convey a brooding atmosphere at the start of the second act of the opera Siegfried.

In his early cantata , Debussy uses a tritone to convey the words of the poem by Dante Gabriel Rossetti.

Roger Nichols (1972, p19) says that "the bare fourths, the wide spacing, the tremolos, all depict the words—'the light thrilled towards her'—with sudden, overwhelming power." Debussy's String Quartet also features passages that emphasize the tritone.

The tritone was also exploited heavily in that period as an interval of modulation for its ability to evoke a strong reaction by moving quickly to distantly related keys. For example, the climax of Hector Berlioz's  (1846) consists of a transition between "huge B and F chords" as Faust arrives in Pandaemonium, the capital of Hell. Musicologist Julian Rushton calls this "a tonal wrench by a tritone".

Later, in twelve-tone music, serialism, and other 20th century compositional idioms, composers considered it a neutral interval. In some analyses of the works of 20th century composers, the tritone plays an important structural role; perhaps the most cited is the axis system, proposed by Ernő Lendvai, in his analysis of the use of tonality in the music of Béla Bartók. Tritone relations are also important in the music of George Crumb and Benjamin Britten, whose War Requiem features a tritone between C and F♯ as a recurring motif. John Bridcut (2010, p. 271) describes the power of the interval in creating the sombre and ambiguous opening of the War Requiem: "The idea that the chorus and orchestra are confident in their wrong-headed piety is repeatedly disputed by the music. From the instability of the opening tritone—that unsettling interval between C and F sharp—accompanied by the tolling of warning bells ... eventually resolves into a major chord for the arrival of the boys singing 'Te decet hymnus'." Leonard Bernstein uses the tritone harmony as a basis for much of West Side Story. George Harrison uses tritones on the downbeats of the opening phrases of the Beatles songs "The Inner Light", "Blue Jay Way" and "Within You Without You", creating a prolonged sense of suspended resolution. Perhaps the most striking use of the interval in rock music of the late 1960s can be found in Jimi Hendrix's song "Purple Haze". According to Dave Moskowitz (2010, p. 12), Hendrix "ripped into 'Purple Haze' by beginning the song with the sinister sounding tritone interval creating an opening dissonance, long described as 'The Devil in Music'." The opening riff of "Black Sabbath", the first song on Black Sabbath's eponymous debut album, is an inversion of a tritone; the album, and this song in particular, are considered to mark the birth of heavy metal music.

Tritones also became important in the development of jazz tertian harmony, where triads and seventh chords are often expanded to become 9th, 11th, or 13th chords, and the tritone often occurs as a substitute for the naturally occurring interval of the perfect 11th. Since the perfect 11th (i.e. an octave plus perfect fourth) is typically perceived as a dissonance requiring a resolution to a major or minor 10th, chords that expand to the 11th or beyond typically raise the 11th a semitone (thus giving us an augmented or sharp 11th, or an octave plus a tritone from the root of the chord) and present it in conjunction with the perfect 5th of the chord. Also in jazz harmony, the tritone is both part of the dominant chord and its substitute dominant (also known as the sub V chord). Because they share the same tritone, they are possible substitutes for one another. This is known as a tritone substitution. The tritone substitution is one of the most common chord and improvisation devices in jazz.

See also 
 List of meantone intervals
 List of musical intervals
 List of pitch intervals
 Ditone
 Tone
 
 
 Petrushka chord
 Tritonic scale

References

Further reading
R., Ken (2012). DOG EAR Tritone Substitution for Jazz Guitar, Amazon Digital Services, Inc., ASIN: B008FRWNIW

External links 
 
 BBC News Magazine article about the tritone
 Satan's all-time greatest hit: Will Hodgkinson on the devil's interval

Augmented fourths
Diminished fifths
The Devil in classical music